is a 1972 Japanese women in prison film produced by Toei Company. Starring Meiko Kaji, the film is Shunya Itō's first film as a director and is based on a manga by Tōru Shinohara.

The film was followed by several sequels, including Female Prisoner Scorpion: Jailhouse 41 and Female Prisoner Scorpion: Beast Stable, and has also been remade several times.

Plot
Nami Matsushima is used as a spy by her first real boyfriend, a police detective named Sugimi, to investigate a drug smuggling ring. However, her role is discovered and she is raped by several drug dealers. It emerges that Sugimi was simply using Matsushima as a pretext to obtain a bribe from the yakuza. Seeking revenge, Matsushima makes a failed attempt to stab Sugimi on the steps of the Tokyo Metropolitan Police headquarters. She is sentenced to do hard time in a women's prison, where she is given the number 701.

The prison is run by sadistic and lecherous male guards. The prisoners are forced to walk up and down a stair-like contraption naked with male guards watching from below. While incarcerated, Matsushima meets inmates like Yuki Kida, who was convicted for fraud and theft; Otsuka, jailed for burglary and extortion; and Katagiri, who was imprisoned for arson and illegally disposing of a body. Outside the prison, Sugimi and the yakuza orchestrate a plan in which Matsushima will succumb to an "accidental" death in prison.

The conspirators enlist the help of Katagiri and quickly set their plan in motion. Matsushima is attacked in the shower but defends herself, wounding the attacker. She is punished by being held bound by ropes in solitary confinement. A group of trustees, including Katagiri, tortures her; one pours hot soup on her. Matsushima is able to trip the trustee and make her spill the vat of hot soup over herself, causing horrible burns. Matsushima is forced to dig dirt holes for two consecutive days and nights. She kills a woman who attempts to attack her during this digging by tripping her and breaking her neck. In response, Matsushima is hung and tied from the ceiling while being beaten by her fellow prisoners.

After a prison riot, Matsushima escapes and kills Sugimi and all of the yakuza with a dagger. The film ends with Matsushima walking alone back in prison.

Cast
Meiko Kaji - Nami Matsushima / Matsu the Scorpion
Rie Yokoyama - Katagiri
Yayoi Watanabe - Yukiko Kida
Yōko Mihara - Masaki
Akemi Negishi - Otsuka
Keiko Kuni - Nemoto
Yumiko Katayama - Kito
Emi Jo - Morikawa
Isao Natsuyagi - Tsugio Sugimi
Fumio Watanabe - Warden Goda

Release
Female Prisoner #701: Scorpion was released in Japan on 25 August 1972.

Home media
Female Prisoner #701 was first released on DVD for Region 1 by Tokyo Shock on April 27, 2004. UK home video company Arrow Films released the film on Blu-ray on July 26, 2016 within a box-set containing the first four films of the Female Prisoner Scorpion series.

Reception
From retrospective reviews, Sight & Sound described the film as "pure exploitation" and that "there are a fair number of arty flourishes: expressionistic lighting and make up effects, theatrically stylised sets and gymnastic camerawork."  The magazine commented on any feminist reading of the film, noting that any suggestion of a "feminist critique of patriarchal society" is "hard to reconcile with the sustained, glib emphasis on female torment." Video Watchdog described Female Convict #701 Scorpion as "inferior to its follow-up Female Convict Scorpion-Jailhouse 41", noting that it is "largely set-bound and lacking grandeur and poetry of its sequel"

Notes

References

See also
 List of Japanese films of 1972

External links

1972 films
1970s Japanese-language films
Japanese prison films
1970s prison drama films
1970s crime action films
1970s action thriller films
1970s crime thriller films
1970s erotic thriller films
Female Convict Scorpion series
Films directed by Shunya Itō
Films scored by Shunsuke Kikuchi
Live-action films based on manga
Rape and revenge films
Women in prison films
Toei Pinky Violence
Toei Company films
1972 directorial debut films
Japanese LGBT-related films
1972 LGBT-related films
Japanese crime thriller films
1970s exploitation films
Japanese vigilante films
Japanese films about revenge
1970s Japanese films